William Milligan Fraser, 1st Baron Strathalmond  (3 November 1888 – 1 April 1970) was a Scottish oilman. Fraser served from 1941 to 1954 as the fourth and final chairman of the Anglo-Iranian Oil Company, and from 1954 to 1956 as the first chairman of British Petroleum.

Biography
Fraser was the second son of William Fraser, of Glasgow, the founder of the Pumpherston Oil Company, and his wife Janet Loch. He joined his father's firm in 1909 and became a director in 1913 and joint managing director in 1915. He was appointed Commander of the Order of the British Empire (CBE) in 1918 for his work in increasing oil supply during the First World War. Fraser joined the board of the Anglo-Persian Oil Company in 1923. He became deputy chairman (to John Cadman) in 1928, and played a great role in expanding the oil production in Iran, Iraq and Kuwait, becoming known as a leading expert on Middle East oil. In 1941 he succeeded Cadman as chairman, a post he retained until 1956 (the firm was renamed the British Petroleum Company in 1954). Fraser was also an adviser on oil affairs to the British government for many years, notably as petroleum adviser to the War Office and as chairman of the Oil Advisory Committee.

Honours
After being appointed Commander of the Order of the British Empire in 1918, Fraser was knighted in 1939 and in 1955 he was raised to the peerage as Baron Strathalmond, of Pumpherston in the County of Midlothian.

Marriage & Children
Lord Strathalmond married Mary Roberton McLintock (born 11 April 1892, died 17 October 1963), daughter of Thomas McLintock, in 1913. They had one son and one daughter:

 William Fraser, 2nd Baron Strathalmond (born 8 May 1916, died 27 October 1976)
 Hon Mary Joan Fraser (born 29 Oct 1922, died 6 March 2004)

Lord Strathalmond died in April 1970, aged 81. He was succeeded in the barony by his only son, William.

He is buried at Putney Vale Cemetery in South West London.

Arms

References

William, E. T., Nicholls, C. S (editors). The Dictionary of National Biography, 1961-1970. Oxford: Oxford University Press, 1981.
Kidd, Charles, Williamson, David (editors). Debrett's Peerage and Baronetage (1990 edition). New York: St Martin's Press, 1990, 

1888 births
1970 deaths
Anglo-Persian Oil Company
Burials at Putney Vale Cemetery
British businesspeople in the oil industry
Chairmen of BP
Commanders of the Order of the British Empire
20th-century Scottish businesspeople
Hereditary barons created by Elizabeth II